David Whitfield Lewis (19 February 1939 – 8 November 2011) was a British industrial designer. He is best known for his work for Bang & Olufsen. He was a distinguished member of Royal Designers for Industry.  Several of the products he designed are included in the MoMA permanent collection of design.

Life 

David Whitfield Lewis was born in London. He wanted to become a furniture designer, but the class at London's Central School of Art and Design was full. So instead, he decided on education as an industrial designer. He had a keen interest in Danish design and architecture.

He met a Danish au pair, who would later become his wife. The couple moved to Denmark in the 1960s.

Design 

Lewis founded David Lewis Designers in Copenhagen, and from this studio, he would live to design an impressive range of products. In the early 1980s, Bang & Olufsen made David Lewis, their chief designer. This unique freelance relationship resulted in numerous international design icons. Lewis was the studio's man, with his sparkling creativity and vitality always very involved with projects. His fellow claim that he could turn things upside down and chase the yet unseen. He brought a tireless desire to change the conventions and to go new ways. 'He never asked "Why?" but always "Why not?"'

Selected products 
 Beocenter 2200 (1983), Hi-Fi system
 Beovision MX 2000 (1985), TV designed like a monitor. ID Award in 1986
 Beolink 1000 (1985), Remote control. ID Award 1986
 Beovox Red Line (1985), Loudspeaker
 Beovision LX 2800 (1986), TV
 Beosound Ouverture (1991), Hi-fi system that presented inserted CDs upright
 Beolab 6000 (1992), loudspeaker. Awards: MOMA 1993, IF 1993
 Beolab 8000 (1992), loudspeaker looking similar to an organ pipe. Awards: MOMA 1993, IF 1993
 Beosound Century (1993), Hi-Fi upright standing. Awards: ID 1994, Good Design Japan 1994
 Beolab LCS 9000 (1993), Active loudspeaker Award: Good Design Japan 1994
 Beo 4 (1994), a very slender remote control
 BeoVision Avant (1995), TV with video tape
 BeoLink Passive (1995), amplifier
 Beosound 9000 (1996), the iconic "6 CDs in a row" Hi-fi system
 Beocenter AV 5 (1997), TV with a radio and CD player
 BeoLab 4000 (1997), active loudspeaker. Awards: IF 1998, Good Design Japan 1998
 Beovision 1 (1999), TV
 Beolab 1 (1999), active loudspeaker. 
 Beocenter 6 (2003), free standing television on a stand with an iconic silhouette
 Beosound 8 (2010), dedicated iPod speakers
 Serenata, mobile telephone with loudspeaker

Awards 
David Lewis is currently represented with three Bang & Olufsen products in the permanent design collection of The Museum of Modern Art, New York. He received several other awards and prizes:

 2007: Honorary fellow, RIBA, Royal Institute of British Architects
 2003: Danish Design Council Annual Prize
 2002: Knight of the Dannebrog, Denmark
 1995: Royal Designer for Industry, London
 1994: The Danish ID prize
 1994: The Japanese G-mark Design Award
 1993: The Japanese G-mark Design Award
 1992: The Japanese G-mark Prix
 1991: The Japanese G-mark Design Award
 1990: The Danish ID prize
 1990: The Japanese G-mark Design Award
 1989: The Japanese G-mark Design Award
 1982: The Danish ID prize
 1976: The Danish ID prize

References

External links
 
 David Lewis at BeoWorld
 David Lewis at The Wall Street Journal
 David Lewis obituary at Core77

Industrial designers
1939 births
2011 deaths